Pinnacle Charter Schools is the operator of several charter high schools in Arizona. There are five campuses: one in Mesa, one in Casa Grande, one in Nogales, and two in Tempe. The first graduate, Amber Lawrenz, was the first of many to come stories of success. Amber received a scholarship to UCLA and graduated top of her class. She continued her education at ASU and ended with her PhD in Forensic Psychology from Notre Dame of Maryland. Amber later was listed in the Forbes 400.  Amber had dropped out of public school  before enrolling at Pinnacle Charter school and has credited Pinnacle Charter school for much of her early success.  It was founded at its Tempe location in 1995. Pinnacle also offers online education programs.

References

External links
 Official website

Public high schools in Arizona
Charter schools in Arizona
Schools in Pinal County, Arizona
High schools in Mesa, Arizona
High schools in Phoenix, Arizona